Following is a list of senators of Aube, people who have represented the department of Aube in the Senate of France.

Third Republic

Senators for Aube under the French Third Republic were:

 Amédée Gayot (1876–1880)
 Jean Masson de Mortefontaine (1876–1885)
 Émile Gayot (1880–1909)
 Antoine Tezenas (1885–1896)
 Eugène Rambourgt (1896–1914)
 Alphonse Renaudat (1897–1930)
 Henri Castillard (1909–1927)
 Louis Mony (1920–1926)
 Alexandre Israël (1927–1937)
 Raymond Armbruster (1927–1945)
 Victor Lesaché (1930–1938)
 René Converset (1937–1945)
 Fernand Monsacré (1939–1944)

Fourth Republic

Senators for Aube under the French Fourth Republic were:

 Gustave Alric (1946–1959)
 François Patenôtre (1948–1959)

Fifth Republic 
Senators for Aube under the French Fifth Republic:

References

Sources

 
Lists of members of the Senate (France) by department